Conservatism in Australia refers to the political philosophy of conservatism as it has developed in Australia. Politics in Australia has since at least the 1910s been most predominantly a contest between the Australian labour movement and the combined forces of anti-Labour groups. The anti-Labour groups have at times identified themselves as "free trade", "nationalist", "anti-communist", "liberal", and "right of centre", among other labels; until the 1990s, the label "conservative" had rarely been used in Australia, and when used it tended to be used by pro-Labour forces as a term of disparagement against their opponents.

Terminology
In the early 20th century, "Conservatism" was used as a disparaging epithet by detractors of right wing politics and politicians within Australia, often by supporters and members of left leaning movements and parties such as the Australian Labor Party and later the Australian Greens. People on the right called themselves "liberals". That only changed in the late 20th century; John Hirst says that as a significant political movement, conservatism is "a very recent arrival in Australia". John Howard, who became prime minister in 1996, was the first holder of the office to describe himself as a conservative."

In the 21st century the term covers similar political issues as found in other Western democracies. In the early 20th century the liberals had connections with reform movements. However, as Howard has argued, the Liberal Party became the trustee of both the classical liberal and conservative traditions.  That is, it combines liberal (market-based, pro-business, anti-union) economic policies with conservative social policies.

Although used much less than the term conservative, former Prime Minister Scott Morrison (Liberal) described himself as a traditionalist upon his ascent to party leader and appointment as Prime Minister (2018–2022).

Political parties
Mainstream political conservatism is primarily represented by the Liberal Party of Australia, and its coalition partner, the National Party, which historically was the party of the conservative small farmers and espoused agrarianism. The Liberal Party was formed in 1944 as a successor of the United Australia Party, which had been formed in 1931 as a successor of the Nationalist Party and ideologically similar parties that preceded it. The Liberal Party’s ideology has been described as conservative, liberal-conservative, conservative-liberal, and classical liberal. The Liberal Party tends to promote economic liberalism (which in the Australian usage refers to free markets and small government).

Moser and Catley state, "In America, 'liberal' means left-of-center, and it is a pejorative term when used by conservatives in adversarial political debate. In Australia, of course, the conservatives are in the Liberal Party." Jupp points out that, "[the] decline in English influences on Australian reformism and radicalism, and appropriation of the symbols of Empire by conservatives continued under the Liberal Party leadership of Sir Robert Menzies, which lasted until 1966." Beecher comments that, "across the economic and cultural landscape, Howard proved that the centre of politics in Australia is inherently conservative."

There are also other minor parties which may be perceived to be conservative in orientation on account of some of their policies - and even some are regarded as right wing or extreme right, such as the Democratic Labor Party, One Nation Party, Liberal Democratic Party, Family First Party, Australian Christians, Shooters, Fishers and Farmers Party, and Katter's Australian Party, although some would not champion the classical liberal approach to economics adopted by the Liberal Party. In the 45th Australian Senate, the Liberal Democratic Party's David Leyonhjelm, the Independent Cory Bernardi, Independent Fraser Anning and the United Australia Party's Brian Burston formerly formed a "conservative bloc".

Since the 2010s, an increasing number of prominent conservative members of the Liberal/National coalition have left the party, such as in 2017 with Senator Cory Bernardi and in 2022 with MP George Christensen.

Think tanks and other entities
Some think tanks in Australia have a conservative focus. The Centre for Independent Studies, for example, focuses on classical liberal issues such as free markets and limited government, while the Institute of Public Affairs advocates free market economic policies such as privatisation and deregulation of state-owned enterprises, trade liberalisation and deregulated workplaces, climate change scepticism, the abolition of the minimum wage, and the repeal of parts of the Racial Discrimination Act 1975. The H. R. Nicholls Society focuses on industrial relations, and advocates full workplace deregulation, contains some Liberal MPs as members and is seen to be of the New Right. The Menzies Research Centre is an associated entity of the Liberal Party.

Apart from political parties, conservative grass-roots movements have also arisen in Australia in recent years. Q Society of Australia is a far-right anti-Muslim association that works closely with the Australian Liberty Alliance. Some of these may have connections to existing political leaders, such as Senator Cory Bernardi’s Conservative Leadership Foundation (which is dedicated to fostering community based conservative leadership) or explicitly reject party politics in favour of cultural restoration, such as the Sydney Traditionalist Forum and Edmund Burke's Club <ref>"[http://edmundburkesclub.org.au/ Edmund Burke's Club]</ref>  (which are described as “an association of ‘old school’ conservative, traditionalist and paleoconservative individuals”).

In Australia however there are some differences in the political landscape in which conservatism exists, compared to what is found in other countries, especially in economics. Australia undertook in the mid-1980s significant economic reforms – faith in markets, deregulation, a reduced role for government, low protection and the creation of a new cooperative enterprise culture - under the centre-left Australian Labor Party and especially under social liberal Paul Keating."

Media
Two national newspapers in Australia, The Australian and The Australian Financial Review, take a conservative stance. Since the 1970s, the Financial Review has advocated economic liberalism in Australia, driving a consistent editorial line favouring small government, deregulation, privatisation, lower taxes and trade liberalisation.

Major conservative regional newspapers include The Daily Telegraph, The West Australian, The Mercury, The Canberra Times, The Advertiser and The Courier-Mail.

The primary conservative magazines in Australia are News Weekly, Quadrant and The Spectator Australia.

On television, a conservative outlook is represented by Sky News Australia.

Newspapers and other publications owned by News Corp have been accused of adopting anti-Labor political positions. The publications owned by News Corp include The Australian, The Daily Telegraph, The Mercury, The Advertiser and The Courier-Mail. Sky News is also owned by News Corp.

Monarchism

 

Whether Australia should remain a monarchy or become a republic was a contentious issue in the 1990s. It has since not been a priority for the government as of 2019. In 1998 when debate peaked, Howard took the monarchist position favoured by most conservatives. Howard argued that the monarchy had provided a long period of stability and whilst he said there was no question that Australia was a fully independent nation, he believed that the "separation of the ceremonial and executive functions of government" and the presence of a neutral "defender of constitutional integrity" was an advantage in government and that no republican model would be as effective in providing such an outcome as the Australian constitutional monarchy. Despite opinion polls suggesting Australians favoured a republic, the 1999 republic referendum rejected the model proposed by the 1998 convention involving appointment of the head of state by Parliament. Conservatives generally support keeping the current flag (with its British insignia) and are proud of the nation's British heritage.

 Aboriginal conservatism in Australia 
Traditionally, Aboriginal Australians have been known to predominantly vote for parties of the political left, such as the Australian Labor Party or the Australian Greens. Despite this, there are numerous Aboriginal activists, politicians and individuals affiliated with the political right. The most prominent Aboriginal Conservative was Neville Bonner who was the first Aboriginal Australian elected to federal Parliament.   

Jacinta Price is a well-known conservative activist of Warlpiri descent who stood for the Country Liberal Party (CLP) in Lingiari in 2019. Price has argued against claims of systemic racism against Aboriginals in the criminal justice system, instead arguing that "black-on-black violence" is most pressing in Aboriginal communities. Unlike many Aboriginal activists, Price opposes changing the date of Australia Day, describing the proposal as "virtue-signaling".

Originally a member of Labor, former Indigenous Advisory Council (IAC) member Warren Mundine has since shifted toward the political right. Mundine has criticized what he describes as efforts to introduce "critical race theory" in Australian schools, arguing it promotes a victim mentality among Aboriginals.

Former Aboriginal conservative politicians include:
 Adam Giles – Served as the Chief Minister of the Northern Territory (2013-2016).
 Joanna Lindgren – A former LNP Senator for Queensland (2015 to 2016).
 Hyacinth Tungutalum – The first  Aboriginal Australian elected to a State or Territorial parliament, a member of the Country Liberal Party (1974-1977).
 Bess Price – A former Northern Territory Minister for Community Services, a member of the Country Liberal Party (2012-2016)
 Eric Deeral – Queensland MP representing the Country Party (1974-1977)

See also

 Christian politics in Australia
 History wars
 Liberalism in Australia
 Socialism in Australia

References

Bibliography
 
 
 
 
 

Further reading
 Hirst, John, "Conservatism," in Graeme Davison et al. eds., The Oxford Companion to Australian History '' (2nd ed. 2001) pp 148–50

 
Political movements in Australia